The Curragh is a plain in County Kildare, Ireland.

Curragh or Curraghs may also refer to:

Associated with the Curragh of Kildare
 Curragh Racecourse
 Curragh Cup run at the course
 Curragh Camp, of the British Army and later the Irish Army
 Curragh incident 1914 "mutiny" by British officers
 Curragh Camp GAA
 Battle of the Curragh, 1 April 1234 between forces of the Lord of Ireland and the Lord of Leinster

Other
 Curragh coal mine in Central Queensland, Australia
 Curragh, Kilcumreragh, a townland in Kilcumreragh civil parish, barony of Moycashel, County Westmeath, Ireland
 Curragh, St. Mary's, a townland in St. Mary's civil parish, barony of Brawny, County Westmeath, Ireland
 Curraghs, Isle of Man wetland area
 Curraghs Wildlife Park
 Currach, occasionally curragh, traditional Irish rowing boat

Note: There are more than 20 other townlands in Ireland with the name Curragh.